Little Ship may refer to
The Little Ships of Dunkirk, vessels that took part in the Dunkirk evacuation in 1940
Little Ship (album), a 1997 album by Loudon Wainwright III
The Little Ship Club, a yacht club